Ivan Stevanović (Serbian Cyrillic: Иван Стевановић; born 24 June 1983) is a Serbian former professional footballer.

Club career
Stevanović's transfer to FK Partizan was announced on 5 June 2008, with Ivan signing a three-year contract with the possibility of a one-year extension.  The Serbian international is believed to have been signed as a replacement for the recently departed Nemanja Rnić who left on a free transfer to RSC Anderlecht.

In early July 2009, Stevanović was reported to be set to join the French club FC Sochaux-Montbéliard for a fee believed to be around €1 million and signed one day later a contract until June 2012. On 17 June 2010, Partizan loaned for one season the right-back, the 26-year-old returned to Partizan who played in the 2008–09 season.

International career
Serbian then coach Javier Clemente named 10 uncapped players in his 20-man squad for the rescheduled Euro 2008 qualifier at home to Kazakhstan on Saturday, 24 November 2007, which included Stevanović.

References

External links
 Ivan Stevanović at Reprezentacija.rs
 

1983 births
Living people
Sportspeople from Čačak
Serbian footballers
Association football fullbacks
Serbia international footballers
FK Borac Čačak players
OFK Beograd players
FK Partizan players
FC Sochaux-Montbéliard players
Serbian SuperLiga players
Ligue 1 players
Serbian expatriate footballers
Expatriate footballers in France